The 2016–17 Feldhockey-Bundesliga was the 75th season of the Men's Feldhockey Bundesliga, Germany's premier field hockey league. The season started on 17 September 2016 and ended on 28 May 2017 with the championship final.

Mannheimer HC won their first ever Bundesliga title by defeating the defending champions Rot-Weiss Köln 3–2 in the final.

Teams

A total of 12 teams participated in this season of the Bundesliga. Klipper THC and TuS Lichterfelde were the promoted teams who replaced the relegated Blau-Weiss Berlin and Schwarz-Weiß Neuss.

Number of teams by state

Regular season

Standings

Results

Top goalscorers

Play-offs

Bracket

Semi-finals

Final

References

Feldhockey Bundesliga (Men's field hockey)
Bundesliga 2016–17
Feldhockey-Bundesliga 2016–17
Feldhockey-Bundesliga 2016–17